Edgar Smithurst (5 November 1895 − April 1978) was an English footballer who played as a right winger with Oldham Athletic, West Ham United, Chesterfield, and Doncaster Rovers.

Playing career

Oldham Athletic
Born in Eastwood, Nottinghamshire, Smithurst is first known for playing at Oldham Athletic who were in the First Division.

West Ham United
In early 1920, he was signed by Second Division club West Ham United. He played three games before leaving for Chesterfield for £100 in August 1921.

Chesterfield
In the 1921–22 season Chesterfield were a founding club of the Football League Third Division North, but despite the drop in leagues, Smithurst was soon moved on to an even lower league level. He made 14 League appearances, scoring once in a 6–1 defeat at Wrexham when he delivered a high centre into the Wrexham area and the flight of the ball deceived the Wrexham keeper.

Doncaster Rovers
He arrived at Midland League side Doncaster Rovers part way through the 1921–22 season. In what was a mid-table season, he scored just one goal, a penalty in a 1–0 victory at Mexborough Town. The following season he played in the first game at their new ground, Low Pastures which was to become known as Belle Vue, in front of which was then Doncaster's highest ever home crowd of around 10,000.

References

1895 births
1978 deaths
People from Eastwood, Nottinghamshire
Footballers from Nottinghamshire
English footballers
Association football wingers
West Ham United F.C. players
Doncaster Rovers F.C. players
Chesterfield F.C. players
Oldham Athletic A.F.C. players
English Football League players
Midland Football League players